Nilson Corrêa Júnior (born 26 December 1975), known simply as Nilson, is a Brazilian former footballer who played as a goalkeeper, currently head coach of Campeonato Pernambucano club .

Most of his professional career was spent in Portugal with Vitória de Guimarães, where he appeared in 226 competitive matches over seven seasons, six spent in the Primeira Liga. He also played for three years with Persepolis in Iran.

Playing career

Club

Brazil
Born in Vitória, Espírito Santo, Nílson started his career at Esporte Clube Vitória, signing with Santa Cruz Futebol Clube in 1999 and achieving promotion from the Campeonato Brasileiro Série B in the same year. He then had loan spells, at Sociedade Esportiva do Gama and Associação Atlética Internacional (Limeira).

Nilson was released by Santa Cruz in 2003, for financial reasons. After an injury-ridden stint with Americano Futebol Clube he joined Clube Náutico Capibaribe, where he won the Campeonato Pernambucano.

Vitória Guimarães
In 2003, Nílson was spotted by Vitória S.C. manager Jorge Jesus and agent António Texeira while playing footvolley, with Jesus wanting him to play in Portugal. They lost touch, but later he was contacted again by Teixeira and agreed to move to Portugal that year after his €90,000 release clause was paid, being first choice from the start but not being able to prevent, however, the Guimarães side from being relegated to the Segunda Liga in his first season.

After only missing two league games in 2006–07 as the Minho team returned to the Primeira Liga, Nilson played all matches the following campaign as they achieved a third place, subsequently reaching the third qualifying round of the UEFA Champions League.

Persepolis
On 17 July 2012, aged nearly 37, Nilson signed a two-year deal with Iranian club Persepolis FC. He helped his new team to finish second in 2013–14 and thus qualify for the AFC Champions League, keeping a Pro League-best 18 clean sheets. 

Nilson extended his contract for another year on 24 May 2014, but was released on 1 January 2015.

Later years
On 10 July 2015, Nilson returned to Portugal with Moreirense FC. For the following campaign, still in that country but in the second tier, he joined C.F. União.

International
Nilson played for Brazil at under-20 level, and was part of the squad that finished runners-up in the 1995 FIFA World Youth Championship although he did not play. In late May 2011, he was invited by Portuguese coach Paulo Duarte to represent the Burkinabé national team, with the nation risking sanctions due to FIFA eligibility rules if he was selected; the following month, the player announced that he would no longer be eligible since a possible call up to the 2012 Africa Cup of Nations would have negative impact in his Vitória Guimarães career.

Coaching career
After retiring, Nilson worked as a coach, mainly in the state of Pernambuco and in amateur football. In quick succession, he was in charge of Flamengo Esporte Clube de Arcoverde, Sociedade Esportiva Ypiranga Futebol Clube, Sociedade Esportiva Decisão Futebol Clube, Vera Cruz Futebol Clube, Retrô Futebol Clube Brasil, Central Sport Club, Associação Cultural e Desportiva Potiguar and Associação Atlética Maguary.

Career statistics

1 includes one match in 2011 Supertaça Cândido de Oliveira.

Honours
Vitória
Campeonato Baiano: 1996, 1997
Campeonato do Nordeste: 1997

Náutico
Campeonato Pernambucano: 2004

Vitória Guimarães
Taça de Portugal runner-up: 2010–11

Persepolis
Iranian Hazfi Cup runner-up: 2012–13

References

External links

Official website 

1975 births
Living people
Brazilian footballers
Association football goalkeepers
Campeonato Brasileiro Série A players
Campeonato Brasileiro Série B players
Campeonato Brasileiro Série C players
Esporte Clube Vitória players
Santa Cruz Futebol Clube players
Sociedade Esportiva do Gama players
Americano Futebol Clube players
Clube Náutico Capibaribe players
Primeira Liga players
Liga Portugal 2 players
Vitória S.C. players
Moreirense F.C. players
C.F. União players
Persian Gulf Pro League players
Persepolis F.C. players
Brazil youth international footballers
Brazil under-20 international footballers
Brazilian expatriate footballers
Expatriate footballers in Portugal
Expatriate footballers in Iran
Brazilian expatriate sportspeople in Portugal
Brazilian expatriate sportspeople in Iran
Brazilian football managers